Herbert Eugene Harris II (April 14, 1926 – December 24, 2014) was a Democratic member of the United States House of Representatives from Virginia. His district included part of Fairfax County.

Early life
Born in Kansas City, Missouri, Harris attended St. Francis Xavier Elementary School, Kansas City from 1930 to 1939.
He graduated from Rockhurst High School, Kansas City, 1943.
He attended Missouri Valley College, Marshall, from 1944 to 1945, and University of Notre Dame from 1945 to 1946.
He earned a B.A. from Rockhurst College in 1948 and a J.D. from Georgetown University Law School, Washington, D.C., 1951.
He was admitted to the Missouri and District of Columbia bars in 1951 and commenced practice in Kansas City.
He moved to the Washington, D.C., area in 1951.
He is the cofounder, vice president, and general counsel of the international trade consultants firm of Warner & Harris, Inc.
He served on the Fairfax County, Virginia, Board of Supervisors from 1968 to 1974.
He served as member of the Northern Virginia Transportation Authority from 1968 to 1974.
He served as vice-chairman of the Washington Metropolitan Area Transit Authority from 1970 to 1974.

Congress
Harris was elected as a Democrat to the 94th Congress in 1974, defeating incumbent Rep. Stanford E. Parris. He was re-elected to the 95th and 96th Congresses, serving January 3, 1975 to January 3, 1981, overall. He was an unsuccessful candidate for reelection in 1980 to the 97th Congress, defeated by Stanford E. Parris, who regained his former congressional seat. In 1982, Harris attempted a comeback, but lost 48.6%-49.7%.  Harris offered sympathy when Stanford E. Parris died in 2010.

Electoral history

Personal life
He resumed the practice of law with firm of Harris & Berg in Washington, D.C.
He was a resident of Mount Vernon, Virginia. Harris died on December 24, 2014, at his house on Fairfax County, Virginia, aged 88.

While in Congress, he was a key proponent for establishing the Quantico National Cemetery. He was interred there with his wife, Nancy Fodell Harris. Mr.Allen was also married to Rae Allen, famous Broadway and television actress.

References

External links

 

1926 births
Lawyers from Kansas City, Missouri
People from Mount Vernon, Virginia
2014 deaths
Burials at Quantico National Cemetery
Rockhurst University alumni
Georgetown University Law Center alumni
Politicians from Kansas City, Missouri
Members of the Fairfax County Board of Supervisors
Democratic Party members of the United States House of Representatives from Virginia
20th-century American politicians
20th-century American lawyers
Members of Congress who became lobbyists